The 2019 Erste Bank Open was a men's tennis tournament played on indoor hard courts. It was the 45th edition of the event, and part of the ATP Tour 500 Series of the 2019 ATP Tour. It was held at the Wiener Stadthalle in Vienna, Austria, from 21 October until 27 October 2019.

Singles main-draw entrants

Seeds

 Rankings are as of October 14, 2019

Other entrants
The following players received wildcards into the singles main draw: 
  Dennis Novak
  Jannik Sinner 
  Jo-Wilfried Tsonga

The following player received entry as a special exempt:
  Adrian Mannarino

The following players received entry from the qualifying draw:
  Aljaž Bedene
  Damir Džumhur
  Márton Fucsovics
  Philipp Kohlschreiber

The following player received entry as a lucky loser:
  Alexander Bublik

Withdrawals
Before the tournament
  Félix Auger-Aliassime → replaced by  Alexander Bublik
  Juan Martín del Potro → replaced by  Andrey Rublev
  Lucas Pouille → replaced by  Pierre-Hugues Herbert
  Nick Kyrgios → replaced by  Lorenzo Sonego
  Daniil Medvedev → replaced by  Feliciano López
  Kei Nishikori → replaced by  Sam Querrey

Retirements
  Pablo Carreño Busta
  Márton Fucsovics

Doubles main-draw entrants

Seeds

1 Rankings are as of October 14, 2019

Other entrants
The following pairs received wildcards into the doubles main draw:
  Sebastian Ofner /  Tristan-Samuel Weissborn
  Marcus Daniell /  Philipp Oswald

The following pair received entry from the qualifying draw:
  Luke Bambridge /  Ben McLachlan

The following pair received entry as lucky losers:
  Frederik Nielsen /  Tim Pütz

Withdrawals
Before the tournament
  Mate Pavić

Finals

Singles

  Dominic Thiem defeated  Diego Schwartzman, 3–6, 6–4, 6–3

Doubles

  Rajeev Ram /  Joe Salisbury defeated  Łukasz Kubot /  Marcelo Melo,  6–4, 6–7(5–7), [10–5]

References

External links
 

Erste Bank Open
Vienna Open
Erste Bank Open
Erste Bank Open